Laudelino is a given name. Notable people with the name include:

Laudelino Barros (born 1975), Brazilian boxer
Laudelino Cubino (born 1963), Spanish road racing cyclist
Laudelino Freire (1873–1937), Brazilian journalist, lawyer and author
Laudelino Mejías (1893–1963), Venezuelan composer